Zimakani is a Papuan language spoken in Papua New Guinea by approximately 1,500 people.

Bibliography
The Unevangelized Fields Mission has texts (gospel tracts) of Zimakani.

Unevangelized Fields Mission. 1956. Jesu’ba Woituwoituda. Unevangelized Fields Mission.
Unevangelized Fields Mission. 1966. John’ba Lagitada Magata. Unevangelized Fields Mission.

References

External links 
 Paradisec has an open access collection that includes Zimakani language materials

Boazi languages
Languages of Western Province (Papua New Guinea)